The Ralliement créditiste du Québec fielded 109 candidates in the 1976 Quebec provincial election, one of whom, party leader Camil Samson, was elected. Information about these candidates may be found on this page.

Candidates

Laurentides-Labelle: Antonio Lemire
Antonio Lemire received 1,499 votes (5.35%), finishing fourth against Parti Québécois candidate Jacques Léonard.

References

Candidates in Quebec provincial elections
1976